The Pitcairn PA-3 Orowing is an early Pitcairn biplane designed for light commercial use in the early 1920s when aircraft production rates did not meet demand for airmail, training, and passenger aircraft.

Development
The Orowing was the first production aircraft from Pitcairn. Pitcairn purchased surplus Curtiss Oriole wings and mated them to production fuselages. The name "Orowing" is a mix of the PA-2 "Sesquiwing" and the Curtiss "Oriole". The initial production run also was powered by 250 surplus Curtiss OX-5 engines.

Design
The three place Biplane was made of welded steel tube fuselage with an OX-5 engine. The aircraft featured dual controls for flight instruction. The wings were purchased from Curtiss and were the same design as a Curtiss Oriole.

Operational history
Most Orrowing production was sold to Pitcairn Aviation for flight training and charters.

An Orowing flew in the 1926 Ford National Reliability Air Tour.

Specifications (Pitcairn PA-3 Orowing)

References

Notes

Bibliography

PA-03
1920s United States civil utility aircraft
Single-engined tractor aircraft
Biplanes
Aircraft first flown in 1926